Grav is a district in the municipality of Bærum, Norway. Mainly a residential area, the population (2009) is 4,463.

References

Villages in Akershus
Neighbourhoods in Bærum